Ľudovít is a given name. Notable people with the name include:

Ľudovít Baťán (1807–1849), the first Prime Minister of Hungary
Ľudovít Černák (born 1951), former Slovak politician, businessman, chairman of ŠK Slovan Bratislava
Ludovit Cordak (1864–1937), Hungarian painter
Ľudovít Cvetler (born 1938), former Slovak football player
Ľudovít Dubovský (1918–1998), footballer
Ľudovít Fulla (1902–1980), Slovak painter, graphic artist, illustrator, stage designer, art teacher
Ludovit Greiner (1796–1882), forest and lumber industry management expert in the Austrian Empire
Ľudovít Kaník (born 1965), Slovak politician and member of the Democratic Party of Slovakia
Ľudovít Komadel (born 1927), Slovak former swimmer
Ludovit Kosut (1802–1894), Hungarian nobleman, lawyer, journalist, politician, statesman and governor-president
Ľudovít Kroner (1925–2000), Slovak actor
Ľudovít Lačný (1926–2019), Slovak chess problem composer and judge
Ľudovít Lancz (1964–2004), football player
Ľudovít Lehen (1925–2014), painter and a FIDE Master for chess compositions
Karol Ľudovít Libai (1814–1888), Slovak lithographer, draftsman and painter
Ľudovít Plachetka (born 1971), Slovak boxer
Ľudovít Potúček (born 1912), Slovak chess master
Ľudovít Rado (1914–1992), Slovak footballer
Ľudovít Rajter (1906–2000), Hungarian composer and conductor from Slovakia
Ľudovít Štúr (1815–1856), Slovak revolutionary politician and writer
Ľudovít Tkáč, former Czechoslovak slalom canoeist who competed in the 1980s
Ľudovít Zlocha (born 1945), Slovak retired international football player

See also
Ľudovít Štúr Order, orders, decorations, and medals of Slovakia
Ľudovítová